Four Freedoms Plaza is a fictional structure appearing in American comic books published by Marvel Comics. It is depicted as being located in the Manhattan of the Marvel Universe; it served as the replacement headquarters for the Fantastic Four when their original dwelling, the Baxter Building, was destroyed by Kristoff Vernard, the adoptive son of Doctor Doom.  It is located at 42nd Street and Madison Avenue in New York City.  The title of the building comes from a Franklin D. Roosevelt speech urging the Congress of the United States to enter World War II.  In it Roosevelt outlined the four freedoms the world would enjoy if it united together to defeat the Axis Power.

Publication history
Four Freedoms Plaza first appeared in Fantastic Four #296 (November 1986). It is unknown who designed it; since the building debuted shortly after the end of John Byrne's run on Fantastic Four, many fans assumed that he designed it, but Byrne has stated that his design for the Fantastic Four's new headquarters was completely different than that of Four Freedoms Plaza, being a simple recycling of his design for the LexCorp tower.

Four Freedoms Plaza received an entry in the Official Handbook of the Marvel Universe Update '89 #3.

Fictional history
By the time of the original Baxter Building's destruction, Reed Richards, brilliant scientist and leader of the Fantastic Four, had already begun to realize that his increasing amount of inventions and equipment was taking up all of the team's available space. After Kristoff Vernard sent the building into space and obliterated it, Reed had the perfect opportunity to rethink his approach to their living space. The result: Four Freedoms Plaza, a 1500', 100 story building of advanced composites, concrete, and glass, designed to Richards's specifications. The top section was built to show the numeral 4 on each side. Of the 100 floors, the top 50 belong to the team, while the bottom 50 belong to the former tenants of the Baxter Building. Reed, realizing the obvious inconvenience of a supervillain destroying your home, offered the tenants increased space under their old terms, including their 99-year leases.

The 'four section' floors were obliterated by an evil double of Reed Richards during the Infinity War event. Only a combination of powers by Invisible Woman and a version of Thor saved lives and the rest of the building.

When the mutant threat Onslaught unleashed an army of Sentinels against New York City, the Fantastic Four teamed with others of Earth's mightiest superheroes to face the threat. Many of the heroes, including the Four, seemingly sacrificed themselves to save the city (as well as saving Reed and Susan Richards's son Franklin, whose incredible power Onslaught wanted to combine with his own). This was not the case, however, as Franklin used his powers to create an alternate universe where the Four unknowingly relived their lives.

With Reed Richards presumed dead, the United States government took steps to seize control of Four Freedoms Plaza and confiscate all of Reed's vastly superior scientific equipment, in accordance with the government's self-serving interpretation of the terms of Reed's will. However, the Fantastic Four's surviving allies did not want the military to gain control of the equipment. Thus, Reed's father Nathaniel Richards (with the assistance of Kristoff Vernard) secretly jettisoned all of it into the Negative Zone.

Subsequently, longtime Avengers foes the Masters of Evil (in the guise of the Thunderbolts, a new superhero team) took over residence of the building, and eventually destroyed it. Upon returning from the alternate reality with Franklin, the Fantastic Four were forced to move into their Manhattan warehouse along the Hudson River, nicknamed "Pier 4". Eventually Reed Richards and an inventor named Noah Baxter built a new Baxter Building in space, and moved it to the location of the former Baxter Building, which remains the Fantastic Four's current headquarters. Today, the name "Four Freedoms Plaza" is sometimes cited as an alternate address for the Baxter Building.

The alternate future of Marvel 2099 still has a Four Freedoms Plaza. It is used by the corporation Stark-Fujikawa.

Description
The building's outer walls and windows are constructed of advanced carbon-fiber composites, said to be nearly comparable in strength to diamond. Numerous small tubes run throughout the sections of the building occupied by the Fantastic Four, enabling Mister Fantastic to easily stretch to any floor or area. One elevator shaft has been deliberately left empty, to facilitate the Human Torch's rapid flight to and from the upper floors. There are a set of "breakaway points" above the 50th and 70th stories with built-in explosive charges, designed to separate the upper floors from the civilian-occupied lower floors, should anyone try to lift the building into orbit.

(The following description of the building encompasses David Edward Martin's omitted section of The Fantastic Four Compendium. Please see below source)

Of the 100 story building:
Floors 1 through 50 belong to the former tenants of the Baxter Building (e.g. Quasar).
Floors 51-70 are "buffer floors", where the tenants do not have 99 year leases. Reed has left this space available in case the team expands or grows and needs more space.
Floors 71-100 serve as the headquarters for the team.  The layout of the floors is essentially the same as that of the Baxter Building.
Floor 71 is a reception area where the team's robot Roberta acts as both a receptionist and a guardian for the rest of the building.
Floor 72 acts as an inn where guests of the team can stay. Two suites maintained solely for aquatic visitors (such as Atlanteans) are accessible from pool entrances. These pools can also be used as aquatic conference rooms, and each suite has a different type of water: one fresh water and one salt water. A watertight elevator connects these suites with the river access tunnel on Sublevel 5.
Floors 73-75 are the team's living quarters.  Besides the four members of the team the floor also accommodated Alicia Masters (later revealed to be the Skrull Lyja), Crystal, Ms. Marvel II, Wyatt Wingfoot, and She-Hulk among others. There was also a kitchen, pantry, spa, two gyms (one for normal strength levels, the other for super-strong users), a large library, and a computerized classroom.
Floors 76 and 77 function as the team's command center. Meeting rooms, communications stations, links to Starcore and other astronomical organizations, and a computerized medical station are here.
Floors 78-80 are storage for miscellaneous supplies. These floors serve as future expansion space and as a buffer in case of a disaster in Reed's laboratory. Alicia claimed a section of 78 as a studio for the times she stayed in the building.
Floors 81-99 act as Reed's laboratory and storage for his equipment. There is an identical workstation on each floor, enabling Reed to work on any floor. The workstation consists of computer terminals, communications console, and mechanical fabricators. None of these workstations is located overhead any other workstation and no three of them are in a straight line. This minimizes the risk of several stations being destroyed in a battle.  The workstations were linked to each other and to a similar console in the Richards's home.
Floors 90 and 91 contains the Negative Zone Portal. The Portal is in a heavily armored room with walls of strongly reinforced material.
Floors 98 and 99 serve as warehouse and machine shops. They support the hangar on 100 and act as a buffer to absorb damage from possible hangar disasters. Fuel tanks for the FF's vehicles are on 99.
Floor 100 is the FF's hangar. It fills the space under the four immense fours that top the building.
The building's foundation reaches 150' into the Manhattan bedrock. There are ten floors there. Sublevels 1-2 are used by the building's maintenance staff. Sublevels 3-4 contain the freight docks and tenant warehouse facilities. A railroad spur enable large masses of freight to be moved in or out without the need to deal with the impenetrable Manhattan traffic. Sublevels 5-15 are restricted to the Fantastic Four.  These floors contain special devices and support facilities for floors 71-100.  Sublevel 5 contains the water-filled conduit that reach the Hudson River; this permits aquatic visitors to directly reach the complex without suffering the indignity of having to swim through the NYC sewer system.

In other media
In season 2 of Fantastic Four, the team replaces the Baxter building for the Four Freedoms Plaza after it was destroyed.

See also 
Freedom of speech
Freedom of worship
Freedom from want
Freedom from fear

References

Other sources
Official Handbook of the Marvel Universe Update '89
Marvel Super Heroes: The Fantastic Four Compendium

Marvel Comics locations
Fantastic Four
Fictional buildings and structures originating in comic books
Fictional elements introduced in 1986